Chain Reaction Cycles is an online retailer of cycling products based in Belfast, Northern Ireland. A 2017 merger with Wiggle Ltd resulted in the formation of the Wiggle-CRC Group, whose head office is in Portsmouth, England.

Chain Reaction Cycles

Chain Reaction Cycles started out as a small bike shop named Ballynure Cycles which was opened in 1985 by George and Janice Watson using a £1500 bank loan in the small village of Ballynure in Northern Ireland.
 
The business moved to larger premises in Ballyclare in 1989 and the name of the shop was changed to Ballyclare Cycles. During this time the Watson family organised some of the first ever downhill races in Ireland and put together the first ever Northern Ireland Downhill series.

As business continued to grow a mail order service was created and advertisements were placed in cycling publications.  In 1998 the business was moved again to a warehouse to accommodate the increase in orders through the mail order service.

In late 1999 the company registered domain name www.ChainReactionCycles.com and launched the Chain Reaction Cycles website. 

The sales grew each year. In 2011 revenues were  £136.4 million (€170 million).  Its peak sales were in 2013, at £155.6 million. By this time the website was providing multi lingual service and currency options for many countries.

By 2015 sales had decreased to £136 million, with shares mainly going to Wiggle, a UK competitor. The company also required investment.

A merger between Wiggle and Chain Reaction Cycles was announced in February 2016.

Chain Reaction Cycles also retain a bricks & mortar retail store on Boucher Road, Belfast.  The store sells a selection of their stock, and has a workshop for cycle maintenance.

CRC makes a small number of its own components and one complete bicycle under its own brand name, "Brand X".

Wiggle merger

After the Competition Commission approved the merger in July 2016 and Wiggle bought 100% of the Chain Reactions Cycle equity from the Watson family, the Wiggle CRC group was formed. 

CRC closed their Northern Irish warehouse to integrate their stock into Wiggle's 'Citadel', but retains its own branding and website. The combined Wiggle CRC group generated an annual revenue of over £300 million. 

In October 2017 Wiggle CRC bought German company Bike24 for over £100 million, which continues to operate separately. The group's combined revenue is now estimated at £500 million.

References

Cycling in the United Kingdom
Retail companies established in 1985
1985 establishments in Northern Ireland